This is a list of bridges and ferry crossings of the Congo River and its major tributaries.

Crossings

Source 
 Google Maps

References 

.
.